The Godzilla: Final Wars soundtrack is the film score to the 2004 film Godzilla: Final Wars composed by Keith Emerson, Nobuhiko Morino, and Daisuke Yano. The soundtrack was released on December 20, 2004 through Victor Entertainment. In 2010, Toho Music released a 3-disc expansion of the soundtrack as part of their 50th Anniversary Godzilla Soundtrack Perfect Collection releases.

Background
During one of Keith Emerson's concerts in Japan, director Ryuhei Kitamura approached him to compose the film's score because he was a fan of Emerson, Lake & Palmer and Progressive Rock. Emerson was concerned whether he would be given enough time before going on tour and was given two weeks to write the film's music; he wrote more tracks than what was used in the final cut. Nobuhiko Morino and Daisuke Yano contributed additional music to the score, however, Emerson did not collaborate with them. "We're All to Blame" by Sum 41 was featured in the film during the battle between Godzilla and Zilla.

Victor Entertainment release

Track listing

Perfect Collection release

In 2010, Toho Music included a 3-disc expanded version on the sixth box set of the Godzilla Soundtrack Perfect Collection releases. The 3-disc soundtrack contains demos and rejected tracks from Emerson, as well as the complete compositions from Morino and Yano.

Track listing

References

Bibliography

External links

Godzilla (franchise)
2000s film soundtrack albums
2004 soundtrack albums